The 2011–12 season of the Women's 2nd Bundesliga was the eighth season of Germany's second-tier women's football league. It began on 28 August 2011 and the regular season ends on 20 May 2012.

The play-off between 10th placed teams didn't take place because Hamburg went from the Bundesliga down to the Regionalliga and only 4 relegations were needed.

Final standings

North

South

References

2010-11
Ger
Women2
2